Wanborough may refer to:

 Wanborough, Surrey, England
 Wanborough Manor
 Wanborough, Wiltshire, England
 Wanborough, Illinois, United States